Zangherella is a genus of araneomorph spiders in the family Anapidae, first described by Lodovico di Caporiacco in 1949. it contains only three species.

References

Anapidae
Araneomorphae genera
Spiders of Africa